Beitanzhuang Township is a township of Lingshou County, Shijiazhuang, Hebei province, China,  located in the eastern foothills of the Taihang Mountains  northwest of the county seat. , it had 12 villages under its administration.

See also
List of township-level divisions of Hebei

References

Township-level divisions of Hebei